Sean Colin Williams (born 26 September 1986) is a Zimbabwean international cricketer and currently captains the national team in Test cricket, who plays all formats primarily as a batting all-rounder. In September 2019, Zimbabwe Cricket named him as Zimbabwe's captain, after Hamilton Masakadza retired from international cricket. Later the same month, Williams captained Zimbabwe for the first time, in the opening Twenty20 International (T20I) match of the 2019–20 Singapore Tri-Nation Series, against Nepal.

Under-19s career 
In the Under-19 World Cup in 2004 he was the pick of Zimbabwe's batsmen with 157 runs at 31.40, as well as five wickets. He led the Under-19 side in the World Cup in Sri Lanka in February 2006, the highlight being a win over England.

Domestic and T20 career 
In first-class cricket, Williams plays for Matabeleland Tuskers. He made his highest domestic score for Westerns against Centrals in 2006–07, when he top-scored in both innings with 76 and 129 in a 77-run victory.

In October 2018, he was named in Tshwane Spartans' squad for the first edition of the Mzansi Super League T20 tournament. In December 2020, he was selected to play for the Tuskers in the 2020–21 Logan Cup.

International career 
He was expected to be called up at the time of the players' strike in April 2004. Almost a year later, and with just one first-class match, he was drafted into the Zimbabwe squad to tour South Africa.

This turned out to be true when he turned down a central contract the following month, opting to look for a more settled career overseas, although he again changed his mind, returning to play for Zimbabwe three months later. Dogged by injuries, the on-off farrago resurfaced in 2008 when he again quit for a contract in South Africa, only to return weeks later.

He scored 178 for a Zimbabwe XI against Ireland in the ICC Intercontinental Cup in 2010–11.

He was ruled out of the Cricket World Cup 2011 due to a fractured thumb.

In 2013, in second Test at Roseau, he made his Test debut against West Indies, scoring 31 and 6.

In September 2013, he made himself unavailable to play the first Test against Pakistan because of the payments issue and was satisfied with an offer made to him and was committed to the country in future.

On 19 February 2015, he scored an unbeaten 76 runs in the Cricket World Cup against the United Arab Emirates. When he came to the crease, Zimbabwe was in deep trouble on 177/5. But finally he guided the team to victory with 76 runs off 65 balls with 7 fours and one six.

He scored his first Test century in his third Test. Playing against New Zealand at Bulawayo in July 2016, he batted at number eight in the second innings and scored 119 off 148 balls. His first century was the fastest ever by any Zimbabwean in Test Cricket. In April 2019, in the ODI series against the United Arab Emirates, Williams scored the fastest century for a Zimbabwe batsman in an ODI match, doing so from 75 balls.

In January 2020 Williams played his first Test series as Zimbabwe Captain in a two match home series against Sri Lanka. He made his second Test century in the second Test match, making 107 before being bowled by Dhananjaya De Silva in a drawn match, Zimbabwe's first home draw since 2017. Sri Lanka won the series 1-0.

Personal life 
He attended Falcon College in Esigodini, Zimbabwe. His father is Collin Williams, a former first-class cricketer and a national field hockey coach, and his brother Matthew Williams has played first-class cricket in Zimbabwe for Matabeleland Tuskers. His mother Patricia McKillop, was a field hockey player, who was a member of the Zimbabwe national team that won the gold medal at the 1980 Summer Olympics His step brother, Michael McKillop is also a first-class cricketer and a field hockey player who played for Matabeleland and also served as the captain of the Zimbabwe men's national field hockey team.

He married Chantelle Dexter in Bulawayo in April 2015.

References

External links
 

1986 births
Living people
Cricketers from Bulawayo
Alumni of Falcon College
Zimbabwean cricketers
Zimbabwe Test cricketers
Zimbabwe One Day International cricketers
Zimbabwe Twenty20 International cricketers
Cricketers at the 2007 Cricket World Cup
Cricketers at the 2011 Cricket World Cup
Cricketers at the 2015 Cricket World Cup
Matabeleland cricketers
Matabeleland Tuskers cricketers
Mid West Rhinos cricketers
Brothers Union cricketers
Tshwane Spartans cricketers
Westerns (Zimbabwe) cricketers
White Zimbabwean sportspeople
Zimbabwean people of Welsh descent
Zimbabwean people of British descent
Zimbabwe Select XI cricketers